Channel 13 or TV13 may refer to:

 Channel 13 – Santa Fe, a television station in Santa Fe de la Vera Cruz, Argentina
 IBC 13, a Filipino commercial television network
 Islands TV-13, a Philippine television network
 DZTV-TV, the flagship station of the Intercontinental Broadcasting Corporation (IBC 13) in Metro Manila, Philippines
 CCTV-13, news channel of China Central Television, People's Republic of China
 Calle 13 (TV channel), a cable/satellite television channel in Spain
 WNET, sometimes referred to as "Thirteen", in Newark, New Jersey, serving the New York City metropolitan area; a primary station of the Public Broadcasting Service 
 Channel 13 (Israel), a television station in Israel
 PTS, a public television service in Taiwan
 Canal 13 (Chilean TV channel), a Chilean free-to-air television channel.
 Canal Trece (Colombian TV channel), a Colombian free-to-air television channel.
 El Trece, a Argentinian TV channel in Buenos Aires, Argentina
 Global Television (Peruvian TV network), formerly Canal 13, a Peruvian free-to-air television channel.
 Trece (Paraguayan television network), formerly RPC, a Paraguayan free-to-air television channel
 WORO-TV, a religious television station in San Juan, Puerto Rico

Mexico
The following television stations are authorized to use virtual channel 13 in Mexico:

Canal 13
 XHBG-TDT in Uruapan, Michoacán
XHCVP-TDT in Coatzacoalcos, Veracruz
XHDY-TDT in San Cristóbal de las Casas, Chiapas
XHGK-TDT in Tapachula, Chiapas
XHTMBR-TDT in Veracruz, Veracruz
XHTMCA-TDT in Campeche, Campeche
XHTMCC-TDT in Ciudad del Carmen, Campeche
XHTMNL-TDT in Agualeguas, Nuevo León
XHTMPT-TDT in Puebla, Puebla
XHTMQR-TDT in Chetumal, Quintana Roo
XHTMVE-TDT in Xalapa, Veracruz
XHTMYC-TDT in Mérida, Yucatán
XHTMYU-TDT in Tizimín-Valladolid, Yucatán
XHTVL-TDT in Villahermosa, Tabasco

Other stations
 XHCTRM-TDT (Imagen Televisión in Reynosa, Tamaulipas)
 XHMH-TDT in Hidalgo del Parral, Chihuahua
XHDUH-TDT (Nu9ve subchannel) in Durango, Durango
 XHDE-TDT in San Luis Potosí, San Luis Potosí

Australia
 10 Shake

See also
 Canal 13 (disambiguation)
 Channel 13 branded TV stations in the United States
 Channel 13 virtual TV stations in Canada

 Channel 13 virtual TV stations in the United States
For VHF frequencies covering 210-216 MHz:
 Channel 13 TV stations in Canada

 Channel 13 digital TV stations in the United States
 Channel 13 low-power TV stations in the United States

13